Jenny Staley Hoad (born 3 March 1934) is an Australian former tennis player who was mainly active in the 1950s.

Career
In 1953 she won the junior singles title at the Australian Championships.
 
As Jenny Staley she reached the singles final of 1954 Australian Championships, played in Sydney, but lost in straight sets to Thelma Coyne Long. In November 1954 she reached the final of the New South Wales Championships which she lost in three sets to Beryl Penrose. In December 1954 she was runner-up to Coyne Long at the Victorian Championships played in Kooyong. Staley won the singles title at the South Australian Championships at Adelaide in January 1955 defeating Fay Muller in the final in straight sets. At the 1955 Australian Championships she partnered her then boyfriend Lew Hoad in the mixed event and were runners-up to Thelma Coyne Long and George Worthington. Her best singles performance at the Wimbledon Championships was reaching the fourth round in 1955, losing to eight-seeded Angela Buxton, and 1956 when she was defeated by fifth-seeded and eventual champion Shirley Fry.

Personal life

Lew Hoad proposed to Staley on her 21st birthday party in March 1955, and they planned to announce their engagement in June in London while both were on an overseas tour. After arriving in London Staley discovered that she was pregnant, and the couple decided to get married straight away. The marriage took place the following day on 18 June 1955 at St Mary's Church, Wimbledon in London on the eve of Wimbledon. They had two daughters and a son. After Hoad's retirement they moved to Fuengirola, Spain, near Málaga, where they constructed and operated the tennis resort Lew Hoad's Campo de Tenis for more than 30 years, entertaining personal friends actors that included Stewart Granger, Sean Connery, Richard Burton, Peter Ustinov, Deborah Kerr and her husband Peter Viertel, Kirk Douglas, singer Frank Sinatra and saxophonist Stan Getz. Lew Hoad was diagnosed with a rare and incurable form of leukemia on 13 January 1994, which caused his death on 3 July 1994, at the age of 59. Jenny Hoad sold the club in April 1999 but has continued to live at the accompanying residential complex. In 2002, she published My Life with Lew with Jack Pollard.

Grand Slam tournament finals

Singles: (1 runner-up)

Mixed doubles: (2 runner-ups)

Grand Slam tournament performance timeline

Singles

References

Sources

External links
 
 Lew Hoad Tennis and Paddle Club

1934 births
Living people
Australian female tennis players
Tennis players from Melbourne
Grand Slam (tennis) champions in girls' singles
Australian Championships (tennis) junior champions